Snaky Lane Community Wildlife Area is a   Local Nature Reserve  Surrey. It is owned by Guildford Borough Council and managed by the Snaky Lane Community Wildlife Group.

This site is managed for wildlife by the local community. It has a variety of habitats with mature trees, grassland, scrub, hedgerows and a pond.

There is access from Stratford Road

References

Local Nature Reserves in Surrey